Renierite is a rare copper zinc germanium bearing sulfide mineral with the chemical formula . It occurs at the Kipushi Mine, Democratic Republic of the Congo; and Namibia, among other places.

Renierite was named after Armand Renier (26 June 1876 - 9 October 1951), a Belgian geologist and director of the Belgian Geological Survey.

References  

Zinc minerals
Sulfide minerals
Germanium minerals
Tetragonal minerals
Minerals in space group 112